Anastasios Kantoutsis (born 23 May 1994) is a Greek professional footballer who plays as a centre back for Football League club Kalamata.

Club career
Born on 23 May 1994, Kantoutsis started his career with the youth squad of Atromitos, where he made a total of 68 appearances. In 2012, he was promoted to the men's team and immediately loaned out to Kalamata, where he played for the next two years, amassing a total of 50 caps. In the 2014–2015 season, Kantoutsis was once again loaned out, this time to Football League side Fokikos, where he featured in 20 matches. After he was released from his contract with Atromitos, Kantoutsis moved to Cyprus and signed a contract with Omonia. In the summer of 2016, Kantoutsis was released from his contract with the Cypriot club, and subsequently returned to Greece, signing for Gamma Ethniki side Ergotelis. Barely a month after signing his contract with the club however, Kantoutsis requested his contract be terminated due to personal reasons.

International career
Kantoutsis has represented Greece in the junior national teams, making several appearances for the U-15, U-17, U-18 and U-19 teams.

References

External links
 
 https://web.archive.org/web/20140801170758/http://www.omonoia.com.cy/?lang=EN&tab=football&section=omonoiateam#football

1994 births
Living people
Greece youth international footballers
Greek expatriate footballers
Atromitos F.C. players
Kalamata F.C. players
AC Omonia players
Niki Volos F.C. players
Ergotelis F.C. players
Expatriate footballers in Cyprus
Association football defenders
Footballers from Athens
Greek footballers
Greek expatriate sportspeople in Cyprus